On Memory Lane is the third studio album of singer-actress Jolina Magdangal released by Star Music on January 23, 2000. The album consists entirely of remakes of originals from the 1950s and 1960s. All but one song are covers of international tunes, while "Sweet Sixteen" is the only Filipino remake. At the time of its release, remakes of international songs were trendy in the Philippines and other artists also had success with covers. Magdangal joined the bandwagon through this album, but instead of exploring the music mines of the '80s and the '70s as most artists did that time, she traipsed across the '50s and the '60s. In its packaging, not only that she is also costumed and made-up as a World War II beauty on the cover but is also photographed in other period costumes inside the booklet.

The album was awarded 6× platinum certification and became one of the best selling albums of all time in the Philippines.

Critical reception
On Memory Lane received positive reviews with David Gonzales of allmusic.com saying "Despite consisting entirely of remakes, this is an enjoyable album, showcasing Magdangal's impressive development", while the Philippine Star said "On Memory Lane makes for easy and enjoyable listening". Gonzales also praised Magdangal's delivery, saying "The young Magdangal does an excellent job here, and her voice has matured impressively since Jolina; her delivery is polished and self-assured. Perhaps if she had sung these tunes first, she would be an international star." The Performer's Rights Society of the Philippines declared the album as one of the finest albums ever released in the Philippines.

Commercial performance
Three days after its release, the album received a gold record certification from the Philippine Association of the Record Industry (PARI), making it the fastest album to reach the gold record certification since PARI took charge in awarding certifications. Eventually, the album received a 6× platinum certification from PARI.

Track listing

Personnel 
Adapted from the On Memory Lane liner notes.

 Vilma B. Selga, Charo Santos-Concio, & Federico M. Garcia – executive producers
 Vehnee Saturno – album producer
 Jong D. Azores – a&r supervision
 Beth N. Faustino – a&r coordinator
 Ronnie Salvacion – photographer
 Matt Rosanes & Jun Magdangal – album concept & design
 Deng Foz – hair & make-up
 Dino Cosio & Jeffrey Rogador – clothes
 Efren San Pedro & Boggie Manipon – recording engineers
 Efren San Pedro – mixing engineer
 Boggie Manipon – mastering engineer

References

2000 albums
Covers albums
Jolina Magdangal albums